is a Shingon Buddhist temple in Matsuyama, Ehime Prefecture, Japan. It is Temple 53 on the Shikoku 88 temple pilgrimage.

History
Said to have been founded by Gyōki, the temple was largely destroyed during the wars of the sixteenth century and has been rebuilt.

Buildings
 Yatsuashi-mon (late seventeenth century with Muromachi period elements) (Prefectural Cultural Property)

See also

 Shikoku 88 temple pilgrimage

References

Buddhist temples in Ehime Prefecture
Shingon Buddhism
Buddhist pilgrimage sites in Japan